In cryptography, Polar Bear is a stream cypher algorithm designed by Johan Håstad and Mats Näslund. It has been submitted to the eSTREAM Project of the eCRYPT network.

External links
 Polar Bear eStream submission

Stream ciphers